Jagoda in the Supermarket is a 2003 Yugoslav  comedy-action film directed by Dušan Milić. The film won the first prime at the 2004 Cinequest Film Festival in San Jose, California. Branka Katić cast in the title role.

Jagoda in the Supermarket was screened at the Berlin Film Festival Perry Seibert, Rovi.

Cast 
 Branka Katić as Jagoda Dimitrijević
 Srđan Todorović as Marko Kraljević
 Dubravka Mijatović as Ljubica
 Goran Radaković as Nebojša
 Danilo Lazović as SWAT Commander
 Mirjana Karanović as Supermarket owner
 Nikola Simić as assassin “Kobac”
 Zorka Manojlović as grandma

Rest of cast listed alphabetically
 Đorđe Branković as young policeman
 Stela Ćetković as Draga
 Branko Cvejić	as Dragan
 Milan Đorđević as Medic
 Nina Grahovac as cashier
 Marko Jeremić	as Limun
 Snežana Jeremić as cashier
 Božidar Stošić as older policeman

References

External links 
 
 
 Inside out film review

2003 films
2000s action comedy films
2000s German-language films
Serbian-language films
Films set in Serbia
Films set in Belgrade
Serbian action comedy films
2003 comedy films
Films shot in Belgrade
Films about police officers